Cesare Nosiglia (born 5 October 1944) is an Italian prelate of the Catholic Church was the Archbishop of Turin from 2010 to 2022. He has been a bishop since 1991, serving first as an auxiliary bishop of Rome, vicegerent of Rome with the title of archbishop from 1996 to 2003, and then Archbishop-Bishop of Vicenza from 2003 to 2010.

Biography
Nosiglia was born on 5 October 1944 in Rossiglione, Italy, and was raised in Campo Ligure. He studied at the seminary in Acqui Terme and was ordained a priest of the Diocese of Acqui on 29 June 1968 by Bishop Giuseppe Dell'Omo. Studying in Rome he obtained a licence in theology from the Lateran University and a licentiate in sacred scripture from the Pontifical Biblical Institute. He worked at the National Catechetical Office of the Italian Episcopal Conference (CEI) from 1971 to 1983, as its vice director from 1983 to 1986, and as director from 1986 to 1991. His pastoral assignments included working at the parish of San Giovanni Battista De Rossi from 1968 to 1975 and the parish of San Filippo Neri from 1975 to 1991. He also taught theology at the Pontifical Athenaeum of Saint Anselm from 1978 to 1980.

On 6 July 1991, Pope John Paul II appointed him Auxiliary Bishop of Rome and Titular Bishop of Victoriana. He was consecrated on 14 September 1991 by Cardinal Camillo Ruini. He was relator of synod of the Diocese of Rome and led its post-synod commission. On 19 July 1996 he was given the personal rank of archbishop and named vicegerent of Rome. He was a member of the CEI's Commission for doctrine and catechesis from 1992 to 1995. He also served as secretary of its Commission for Catholic Education from 1995 to 2000 and then president of that Commission from 2000 to 2005.

On 6 October 2003 he was named Bishop of Vicenza, retaining the personal rank of archbishop. On 25 May 2010 he was elected vice president of the CEI.

On 11 October 2010, Pope Benedict XVI appointed him Archbishop of Turin.

In August 2019, Pope Francis decided that Nosiglia would serve two years passed the normal retirement age of 75.

On 12 October 2019, he was named Apostolic Administrator of Susa.

Pope Francis accepted his resignation from both his Susa and Turin positions on 19 February 2022.

References

External links 

1944 births
Living people
Clergy from Genoa
Italian Roman Catholic archbishops
20th-century Roman Catholics
21st-century Roman Catholics
Pontifical Lateran University alumni
Archbishops of Turin
Pontifical Biblical Institute alumni